Willem Huizing (born 1 February 1995) is a Dutch footballer who plays as a defensive midfielder for Harkemase Boys in the Derde Divisie. He formerly played for SC Heerenveen and FC Emmen.

References

1995 births
Living people
Dutch footballers
Association football midfielders
SC Heerenveen players
FC Emmen players
Eredivisie players
Eerste Divisie players
Derde Divisie players
Footballers from Friesland
People from Drachten
Harkemase Boys players